Mount Bischoff is a mountain and former tin mine in the north-western region of Tasmania, Australia. The mountain is situated adjacent to Savage River National Park near the town of Waratah.

Location and features
Tin was discovered at Mount Bischoff in 1871 by James "Philosopher" Smith. The mountain was named in the early nineteenth century after the Chairman of the Van Diemen's Land Company James Bischoff.

Tin mine 

The mine operated successfully at first by the Mount Bischoff Tin Mining Company, using sluicing with water from the top of the waterfall in Waratah. In June 1883, the mine installed one of the first hydro-electric generators in Australia and employed it to light the offices, workshop and manager's house.  The easy ore was all extracted by 1893 when sluicing was discontinued. Mining continued opencut on the face of the mountain, and underground. The manager of the mine from 1907 to 1919 was John Dunlop Millen; he was "credited with the modernisation of the mine’s facilities and was regarded by all those associated with the mine’s operations as an effective manager". The underground mine closed in 1914, but surface mining continued for some time before it also ceased after the price of tin slumped in 1929. The mine was reopened by the Commonwealth Government in 1942 to support the war effort, but it finally closed in 1947.
The mine was connected to the Emu Bay Railway by the Waratah Branch of that railway which was run from Guildford Junction to Waratah between 1900 and mid 1940.

2000s revival 
After several minor attempts, in 2008 Metals X Limited, a Perth-based mining company, through its subsidiary Bluestone Mines Tasmania Pty Ltd, the operator of the Renison Bell, one of largest tin mines in the world today, decided to mine the remaining tin at Mount Bischoff to blend with ore at its Renison Bell operation. A large open cut operation taking in all the old historic workings was developed at Mount Bischoff for this purpose with the ore being trucked  to the Renison Bell processing plant. At the time ore reserves at Mount Bischoff were estimated to be  grading at 1.20 percent tin. In 2009/10  of ore was mined at the Mount Bischoff open pit that produced  of tin in concentrate. The open cut mine at Mount Bischoff is currently on care and maintenance. Bluestone Mines Tasmania Pty Ltd is continuing its exploration program at Mount Bischoff.

See also

 List of mountains in Tasmania

References

Further reading
 
 
 
  - see (pages 74–78)

 
History of Tasmania
Mountains of Tasmania
Tin mines in Tasmania
North West Tasmania